Prallethrin is a pyrethroid insecticide. Prallethrin 1.6% w/w liquid vaporizer is a repellent insecticide which is generally used for the control of mosquitoes in the household.

Products
It is marketed as a mosquito repellent by Godrej as "GoodKnight Silver Power", SC Johnson as "All Out" and Southern Labs as "Quit Mozz" in India. It is also the primary insecticide in certain products for killing wasps and hornets, including their nests. It is the main ingredient in the consumer product "Hot Shot Ant & Roach Plus Germ Killer" spray.

Environmental effects
The World Health Organization published in 2004 that "Prallethrin is of low mammalian toxicity, with no evidence of carcinogenicity" and "is very toxic to bees and fish but of low toxicity to birds."

Prallethrin is a member of the pyrethroid class of insecticides. Pyrethroids have historically been classified into two groups, Type I and Type II, based upon chemical structure and neurotoxicological effect. Type I pyrethroids lack an alpha-cyano moiety and induce a syndrome in rats consisting of aggressive sparring, altered sensitivity to external stimuli, and fine tremor progressing to whole-body tremor and prostration. These Type I pyrethroid-specific behaviors are collectively described as the T-syndrome. Type II pyrethroids contain an alpha-cyano moiety and produce a syndrome in rats that includes pawing, burrowing, salivation, and coarse tremors leading to choreoathetosis. These Type II pyrethroid-specific behaviors are collectively described as the CS-syndrome (Verschoyle and Aldridge 1980; Lawrence and Casida 1982). Prallethrin is structurally similar to Type I pyrethroids. The adverse outcome pathway (AOP) shared by pyrethroids involves the ability to interact with voltage-gated sodium channels (VGSCs) in the central and peripheral nervous system, leading to changes in neuron firing, and ultimately neurotoxicity.

Prallethrin has been evaluated for a variety of toxic effects in experimental toxicity studies. Neurotoxicity was observed throughout the database and is the most sensitive endpoint. Effects were seen across species, sexes, and routes of administration. In the acute rat neurotoxicity study, decreased exploratory behavior was seen at the time of peak effect. Reduced motor activity and transient tremors were also observed in the study. In the subchronic rat neurotoxicity study, a higher arousal rate was observed in animals at the highest dose tested. Clinical signs of neurotoxicity were also observed in other toxicity studies (subchronic and chronic oral studies in dogs, developmental toxicity studies in the rat and rabbit, 21-day dermal and 28-day inhalation studies in rats). No neurotoxic effects were observed in rats in the chronic toxicity study.

Effects were also observed in the liver (rats, mice, and dogs), heart (dogs), and thyroid gland (rats). Some effects were also seen in the kidney (mice and rats). However, neurotoxicity was the most sensitive endpoint in the toxicology database, and other effects were generally seen in the presence of neurotoxicity and/or at higher doses. Liver effects observed included increased weight, elevated serum cholesterol and alkaline phosphatase activity, centrilobular hepatocyte vacuolation, histiocytic infiltration, enlarged liver, and perilobular hepatocellular hypertrophy. In dogs, myocardial fiber degeneration was seen in females in the subchronic study at the highest dose tested. Heart effects were also seen in one mid-dose female in the chronic study (hemorrhage and red discoloration). However, there was no dose response for the observed heart lesions in the study. Thyroid effects were observed in rats and consisted of increases in the number of small follicles and follicular cell hypertrophy and hyperplasia. The thyroid effects were seen in short-term studies in the presence of liver effects. Kidney effects observed were increased weights and histopathology.

Developmental and reproduction studies are available for prallethrin. There was no evidence of increased quantitative or qualitative susceptibility in any of the studies. In the developmental studies, no toxic effects were noted in fetuses up to the highest doses tested. Maternal effects in the studies included tremors, salivation, exaggerated reflexes, and chromorhinorrhea (the discharge of a pigmented secretion from the nose). In the reproduction study, decreased pup body weights were seen during the lactation period. Effects seen in parental animals were decreased body weights and body weight gains, increased liver weights and microscopic findings in the liver, kidney, thyroid, and pituitary.

Prallethrin is classified as “Not Likely to be Carcinogenic to Humans.” No tumors were observed in rat and mouse carcinogenicity studies up to the highest doses tested. In both the rat and mouse studies, the animals could have tolerated higher dose levels; however, EPA determined that dose levels were adequate to assess potential carcinogenicity.

Prallethrin tested negative in the majority of the genotoxicity studies. It also tested negative in an in vitro chromosomal aberration study in Chinese Hamster Ovary (CHO K1) cells without metabolic activation, but tested positive at all doses with metabolic activation. However, clastogenicity was not clearly dose-related, was seen at nontoxic and slightly toxic doses, and was not expressed in in vivo studies and structure-activity comparisons with the other pyrethroids revealed no correlations with clastogenicity. Other gene mutation, chromosomal aberration, and unscheduled DNA synthesis (UDS) studies were negative; therefore, there is no concern for genotoxicity.

Acute lethality studies conducted with prallethrin indicate moderate acute toxicity via the oral and inhalation routes of administration (Category II) and low acute toxicity via the dermal route (Categories IV). It is not irritating to the skin (Category IV) but is minimally irritating to the eye (Category IV). It is not a dermal sensitizer. The weight of evidence from the available guideline, non-guideline, mechanism of action, and pharmacokinetics studies supports characterizing the toxicological profile of pyrethroids, including prallethrin, as being rapid in onset and associated with acute, peak exposures. Also, there is no apparent increase in hazard from repeated/chronic exposures to prallethrin.

References

External links
 

Allethrins
Propargyl compounds